Coleopsis archaica is an extinct species of stem-group beetle. It is the only member of the genus Coleopsis and family Coleopsidae. It is known from a single specimen from the Early Permian (Asselian) of western Germany, estimated to be about 297 million years old. It is currently the oldest known beetle.

Taxonomy and systematics
While originally interpreted as a member of the family Tshekardocoleidae, this interpretation has been revised and questioned, with the most recent analyses suggesting that it is best placed in its own family, and may be the sister group to all other beetles. The family name was originally published in 2016 as "Coleopsidae" but a later publication claimed that this spelling was erroneous and proposed the spelling "Coleopseidae"; however, under the ICZN, Article 29.4, family-rank names originally published after 1999 are not subject to emendation because of incorrect spelling, so Coleopsidae would be maintained as the correct original spelling.

References

Notes 

Tshekardocoleoidea
†